Io is a 2019 American science fiction film directed by Jonathan Helpert. It stars Margaret Qualley, Anthony Mackie and Danny Huston.

It was released on January 18, 2019, by Netflix.

Plot
The film is set in a post-apocalyptic present, where Earth's atmosphere has become toxic. Most humans have fled the planet, to live on a space station near Io, a moon of Jupiter.

Sam Walden is one of the few humans remaining on Earth. She lives alone at high altitude, where the air is still breathable, trying to raise bees that can survive in the atmosphere. Her intent is to use the bees to eventually clean the air via the pollination of oxygen-producing plants. Her long-distance boyfriend, who lives on the Io station, urges her to leave Earth on the last shuttle from the planet.

A storm creates a toxic cloud that passes through Sam's shelter, killing all of her bees. Micah, a man travelling by helium balloon, arrives shortly thereafter. He intends to reach the launch site and leave Earth, but first wants to speak with Dr. Harry Walden, Sam's father, who had urged mankind to stay because he still saw hope.

Initially, Sam states that her father is conducting field work elsewhere. However, after a day, she reveals that her father died the previous year. Hearing this, Micah is determined to take Sam with him to the space shuttle, to which she apathetically agrees. After receiving a message from her boyfriend saying goodbye, because he is part of an expedition embarking on a 10-year voyage to an exoplanet orbiting Alpha Centauri, Sam records a message informing everyone still on Earth that Dr. Walden's attempt to clean the planet was ultimately unsuccessful and that everybody should leave, and go to Io.

While preparing and waiting for the right wind conditions, Sam and Micah grow closer and become romantically involved. They also discover that a new queen bee hatched in Sam's hive, which is immune to the toxic air. They are informed that the shuttle launch is rescheduled to another site, farther away than the original. As a result, they drive into a city blanketed by the toxic atmosphere to obtain the helium required for the journey. After finding the helium, Sam visits an art museum alone. Micah rushes after her, knowing her oxygen tank is running low. Instead of switching to a new tank, Sam pulls off her mask and breathes the toxic air hoping to survive. She takes several breaths, as the scene fades to black. Micah travels alone to the spaceship because Sam has decided to stay behind.

Like the new queen bee in her colony, the changed environment is not toxic to Sam. The film ends with her standing on a beach alone before being joined by a young child (presumably Micah's son). A voice over of a letter from Sam to Micah tells how beautiful the Earth is, how those who have left the planet will have learned to fear it, and that they are waiting for them to return.

Cast
 Margaret Qualley as Sam Walden
 Anthony Mackie as Micah
 Danny Huston as Dr. Harry Walden
 Tom Payne as the voice of Elon

Production
In January 2015, it was reported that Elle Fanning and Diego Luna would star in the film with Clay Jeter directing from a screenplay he co-wrote with Will Basanta and Charles Spano. However, in October 2016,  Margaret Qualley replaced Fanning, while Anthony Mackie replaced Luna, with Danny Huston also cast for the film. Jonathan Helpert was also set to replace Jeter as director while retaining the Jeter/Basamta/Spano screenplay.

Principal photography began in October 2016.

Release
The film was released on January 18, 2019.

Reception 

The website's critical consensus reads, "IO has some big ideas but little idea of how to effectively convey them, leaving viewers with a sci-fi drama whose attractive packaging can't cover its enervating core." Metacritic, which uses a weighted average, assigned a score of 40 out of 100 based on 6 critics, indicating "mixed or average reviews".

Nick Allen of RogerEbert.com gave the film 2 stars out of 4 stars, writing that, "However pure its intentions, IO is genre minimalism to a fault." He added, "IO isn’t science-fiction storytelling distilled so much as it is vaporized."

See also
List of films featuring space stations
List of Netflix original films (2019)

References

External links
  on Netflix
 

2019 films
American dystopian films
American science fiction films
Films scored by Henry Jackman
Films about interracial romance
English-language Netflix original films
American post-apocalyptic films
2010s English-language films
2010s American films